Fremont Hotel may refer to:
Fremont Hotel and Casino, a hotel and casino in Las Vegas, Nevada
Fremont Hotel, Los Angeles, a hotel in Los Angeles, California